Aberoptus is a genus of mites belonging to the family Eriophyidae. These tiny mites, flattened in shape, live beneath the waxy layer on the underside of the leaves of certain plants.

Species
Species include:
Aberoptus cerostructor Flechtmann, 2001
Aberoptus championus Huang, 2005
Aberoptus platessoides Smith-Meyer, 1989
Aberoptus samoae Keifer, 1951

References

Eriophyidae
Trombidiformes genera